, also called Honda Heihachirō (本多 平八郎) was a Japanese samurai, general and daimyo of the late Sengoku through early Edo periods, who served Tokugawa Ieyasu. Honda Tadakatsu was one of the Tokugawa Four Heavenly Kings along with Ii Naomasa, Sakakibara Yasumasa and Sakai Tadatsugu.

Biography 

Tadakatsu was born in 1548, in Kuramae, Nukata, Mikawa Province (present-day Nishi-Kuramae, Okazaki, Aichi Prefecture), the eldest son of Honda Tadataka. The Honda clan was one of the oldest Anjō fudai families, a family of fudai daimyo who had been serving Tokugawa Ieyasu since he was in Anjō.

Ieyasu promoted him from daimyō/lord of the Ōtaki Domain ( koku) to the Kuwana Domain ( koku) as a reward for his service. In addition, his son Honda Tadatomo became daimyo of Ōtaki.

In 1609, he retired, and his other son Tadamasa took over Kuwana. Tadakatsu's daughter, Komatsuhime was Sanada Nobuyuki's lawful wife and mother of Sanada Nobumasa, daimyō of Matsushiro Domain. His grandson, Tadatoki, married the granddaughter of Tokugawa Ieyasu, Senhime. Despite his years of loyal service, Tadakatsu became increasingly estranged from the Tokugawa shogunate (bakufu) as it evolved from a military to a civilian political institution. This was a fate shared by many other warriors of the time, who were not able to make the conversion from the chaotic lifetime of warfare of the Sengoku period to the more stable peace of the Tokugawa shogunate.

Such was Honda's reputation that he attracted notice from the most influential figures in Japan at the time. Oda Nobunaga, who was notoriously disinclined to praise his followers called him a "samurai among samurai". Moreover, Toyotomi Hideyoshi noted that the best samurai were "Honda Tadakatsu in the east and Tachibana Muneshige in the west". Even Takeda Shingen praised Honda, saying that "he is a luxury of Tokugawa Ieyasu". It was widely acknowledged that he was a reputed samurai and a loyal retainer of Tokugawa Ieyasu.

Tadakatsu is often referred to as "The Warrior who surpassed Death itself" because he never once suffered a significant wound, despite being the veteran of over 57 battles by the end of his life, and because he was never defeated by another samurai. In theater and other contemporary works, Tadakatsu is often characterized as polar opposite of Ieyasu's other great general, Ii Naomasa. While both were fierce warriors of the Tokugawa, Tadakatsu's ability to elude injury is often contrasted with the common depiction of Naomasa enduring many battle wounds, but fighting through them.

Service under Ieyasu

Honda Tadakatsu is generally regarded as one of Tokugawa Ieyasu's finest generals, and he fought in almost all of his master's major battles. He gained distinction at the Battle of Anegawa (1570), helping in the defeat of the armies under the Azai and Asakura clans along with Tokugawa's ally, Oda Nobunaga.

Tadakatsu also served at Tokugawa's greatest defeat, the Battle of Mikatagahara (1572), where he commanded the left wing of his master's army, facing off against troops under one of the Takeda clan's more notable generals, Naitō Masatoyo. Although that battle ended in defeat, Honda Tadakatsu was one of those Tokugawa generals present to exact vengeance upon the Takeda at the Battle of Nagashino (1575). Honda commanded a rank of musketeers as the combined Oda-Tokugawa forces annihilated Takeda Katsuyori's army, partly thanks to the skillful use of ranked muskets, as they fired in cycling volleys. One would fire while another was reloading and another was cleaning the barrel of the musket.  This enabled the muskets to fire without stopping, effectively destroying the Takeda army. Later, he killed Takeda general, Okabe Motonobu, at the second Siege of Takatenjin (1581).

His finest moment came in the Komaki Campaign (1584). Left at Komaki while Ieyasu departed to engage Toyotomi troops at Nagakute, Tadakatsu observed a huge host under Hideyoshi himself move out in pursuit. With a handful of men, Tadakatsu rode out and challenged the Toyotomi army from the opposite bank of the Shōnai River. Toyotomi Hideyoshi (who outnumbered Honda by up to 50 or 60 to 1) was said to have been struck by the bravery of this warrior, and ordered that no harm come to him, his men, or Ishikawa Yasumichi, who accompanied him on this bid to buy time for Ieyasu.

In 1590, Tadakatsu and Sakai Ietsugu capture Sakura Castle and fought against the Chiba clan, allies of the Hōjō in Shimōsa Province, during the Odawara campaign.

In 1600, Tadakatsu had a major role in the Battle of Kuisegawa, where he successfully rescued the Tokugawa officers Nakamura Kazuhide and Arima Toyouji, who were ambushed by the Western Army officers Shima Sakon and Akashi Teruzumi

Later, Honda Tadakatsu was present at the Battle of Sekigahara, when Tokugawa Ieyasu's forces defeated the Western Alliance of under daimyō Ishida Mitsunari, allowing Tokugawa to assume control of the country, bringing the Sengoku era to a close.

Tadakatsu armor and weapon

Tadakatsu seems to have been a colorful figure, around whom a few legends have sprung up - it is often said that of all the battles in which he served, he never once received a wound. His helmet, famously adorned with deer antlers, ensured that he was always a recognizable figure on the field of battle. 
His horse was known as Mikuniguro.

Tonbokiri spear

His spear was named Tonbokiri or Dragonfly Cutter, because legend held that the tip of the spear was so sharp, that a dragonfly that landed on it was cut in two. Tonbokiri was made by Fujiwara Masazane. Tadakatsu's fighting prowess with it was so great that it became known as one of the "Three Great Spears of Japan".

Nakatsukasa sword
Aside from this incredible spear, Tadakatsu also used the katana 
- Nakatsukasaa made by Masamune (中務正宗), a 67 cm blade, another national treasure of Japan.

Popular culture

Honda Tadakatsu appears in numerous Japanese jidaigeki (historical dramas for television) set in the 16th century.  He is a minor character in Akira Kurosawa's movie Kagemusha.

Honda Tadakatsu, or fictive characters based loosely on the historical figure, appears in several video games and associated anime, including the Sengoku Basara games and anime, Samurai Warriors, Warriors Orochi, Nioh 2, Pokémon Conquest, and Kessen.

Honda appears as a playable character in the Mobile/PC Game Rise of Kingdoms.

Notes 

|-

Further reading 

 

1548 births
1610 deaths
Honda clan
Samurai
Fudai daimyo
People of Muromachi-period Japan
People of Azuchi–Momoyama-period Japan
People of Edo-period Japan
Bushido
Deified Japanese people
Tadakatsu